Akbar Jafar (also Romanized as Akbar Jaʿfar) is a village in Cheleh Rural District, in the Central District of Gilan-e Gharb County, Kermanshah Province, Iran. At the 2006 census, its population was 43, in 10 families.

References 

Populated places in Gilan-e Gharb County